This is a list of fish that are considered both halal by Jaʽfari Shia Muslims and kosher by Jews according to halakha.

Criteria of inclusion 

The Jafari Shia Islam rules are approximately equivalent to kashrut rules. The two are generally the least inclusive, and are used as the basis of this article:

 Both traditions require true fish scales. Specifically, Jafari Shia Islam excludes octopus exoskeleton, and Judaism requires visible scales.
 Judaism additionally requires fins, a rule that serves to limit the scope to true fish, and exclude animals with exoskeletons that may be interpreted as scales, such as shrimp. All true fish with scales have fins, but the converse is not true.

All fish in this article have true (visible) fish scales, an endoskeleton, fins, and gills (as opposed to lungs). The requirement for gills is not part of any religious rule, but biologically it is an identifying characteristic of true fish. Any animal lacking any of the latter three features is not a fish, and is therefore not valid for this article.

The rules are relaxed in some Islamic schools of thought, both Shia and Sunni. Some have looser definitions which include the exoskeleton of crustaceans as "scales", others yet include the softer exoskeletons of prawns as "scales" but exclude the harder exoskeletons of lobsters. They also differ in the definition of fish, some adopting a loose definition to include all water life ("sea game").

Kosher
According to the chok or divine decrees of the Torah and the Talmud, for a fish to be declared kosher, it must have scales and fins.

The definition of "scale" differs from the definitions presented in biology, in that the scales of a kosher fish must be visible to the eye, present in the adult form, and can be easily removed from the skin either by hand or scaling knife.

Thus, a grass carp, mirror carp, and salmon are kosher, whereas a shark, whose “scales” are microscopic dermal denticles, a sturgeon, whose scutes can not be easily removed without cutting them out of the body, and a swordfish, which loses all of its scales as an adult, are all not kosher.

When a kosher fish is removed from the water, it is considered "slaughtered," and it is unnecessary to ritually kill it in the manner of kosher livestock.  However, kosher law explicitly forbids the consumption of a fish while it is still alive.

Fish with dairy 
Although Rabbi Yosef Karo of Safed, in his 16th-century legal commentary the Beit Yosef, considers eating milk and fish together to be a health risk, Karo does not mention a prohibition of eating dairy and fish together in the Shulchan Aruch.

Most rabbinic authorities from that time onwards (including almost all Ashkenazi ones) have ruled that this was a scribal error, and there is neither Talmudic basis nor any other rabbinical precedent for prohibiting milk and fish, and thus permit such mixtures. Indeed, two passages in the Babylonian Talmud implicitly state that it is entirely permissible.

Nevertheless, since Karo and other rabbis wrote that milk and fish should not be mixed, there are some Jewish communities whose practice is not to mix them. The Chabad custom is not to eat fish together with actual milk, but to permit it where other dairy products are involved, so that adding a touch of butter or cream to the milk is sufficient to permit mixing it with fish.

Halal

Sunni
In Sunni Islam, there are two general schools of thought. Most Sunni Muslim schools of jurisprudence (Shafi'i, Hanbali, and Maliki) hold as a general rule that all "sea game" (animals of the sea) are permissible to eat with a few minor exceptions. Thus, for example, the local dish Laksa (which includes meats such as shrimp and squid with a soup base made from shrimp paste), is deemed permissible in the Shafi'i Sunni Muslim majority nations of Indonesia and Malaysia where it is commonly consumed.

Hanafi
In the Hanafi school of Sunni Muslim jurisprudence, to which the majority population of Sunni Muslims belong to, only "fish" (as opposed to all "sea game") are permissible, including eel and hagfish.

Any other sea (or water) creatures which are not fish, therefore, are also makrooh (detestable/abominal) whether they breathe oxygen from water through gills (such as prawns, lobsters and crabs which are crustaceans), mollusks such as clams, octopus, mussels and squid, especially if they breathe oxygen from air through lungs (such as sea turtles and sea snakes which are reptiles, dolphins and whales which are mammals, or semi-aquatic animals like penguins which are birds, saltwater crocodiles which are reptiles, seals which are mammals, and frogs which are amphibians).

Shia
Shia Islam allows for consumption of certain fish.  Any fish without scales are haram but fish that do have scales are permissible. Shia scholars tend to teach that no other aquatic creatures are halal, with the exception of certain edible aquatic crustaceans (i.e., shrimps but not crabs), which are also Halal like scaled fish.

List of permitted fish

Albacore
Alewife
Amberjack
Anchovy
Angelfish
Ballyhoo
Barracuda
Atlantic Pomfret
Bass
Bigeye (Family Priacanthidae)
Tautog
Blacksmith
Blue Marlin
Blueback
Bluefish
Bluegill
Bocaccio
Bombay duck
Bonefish
Bonito
Bowfin
Bream
Brill
Broadbill
Buffalo fish
Butter fish
Butterfly fish
Cabrilla
Calico bass
Capelin
Carp
Carpsucker
Cero
Channel bass
Char
Chilean Sea Bass
Chilipepper (all species of Sebastes rockfish)
Chup
Cichlid
Cigarfish
Cisco
Coalfish
Cobia
Cod
Common Snook
Corbina
Cottonwick Grunt
Crappie
Crevalle Jack
Croaker
Crucian carp
Cubbyu
Cunner
Dab
Damselfish
Doctorfish
Eulachon
Flounder
Flatfish
Fluke
Flyingfish
Frostfish
Giant gourami
Gag grouper Mycteroperca microlepis
Giant kelpfish
Gizzard shad
Goatfish
Gobies
Goldeye
Goldfish
Grayling
Graysby
Greenling
Grouper
Grunion
Grunt
Guavina
Haddock
Hake
Halfbeak
Halfmoon
Halibut
Hamlet (fish)
Harvestfish
Hawkfish
Herring
Hind
Hogchoker
Hogfish
Hoki
Horse mackerel
Jack mackerel
Jacks, including Pompanos
Jacksmelt
John Dory
Kelpfish
Kingfish
Ladyfish
Lafayette 
Lake Herring
Largemouth bass
Lingcod
Lizardfish
Lookdown
Mackerel
Mahimahi
Margate
Menhaden
Menpachi
Milkfish (awa)
Mojarras
Mooneye
Moonfish
Mossbunker
Mullet
Muskellunge
Mutton hamlet
Muttonfish
Needlefish
Opaleye
Octopus
Palometa
Parrotfish
Patagonian Toothfish
Perch
Permit
Pickerel
Pigfish
Pike
Pikeperch
Pilchard
Pinfish
Plaice
Pollock
Pomfret
Porkfish
Poutassou
Prickleback
Queenfish
Quillback
Redfish
Roach
Rock bass
Rock hind
Rockfish
Rose fish
Rohu 
Rudderfish
Sablefish
Saithe
Salmon
Sardine
Sargo
Sauger
Scad
Scorpionfish
Scup
Sea bass
Sea chubs
Sea perch
Sea robin
Sea trout
Shad
Sheepshead (Archosargus probatocephalus)
Sierra
Silver hake
Silverside
Skipjack
Smallmouth bass
Smelts
Sparidae (Porgies and Sea bream)
Snappers (including Bluestripe)
Sole
Spadefish
Spanish mackerel
Spearing
Splittail
Spot
Sprat
Squawfish
Squirrelfish
Steelhead
Striped bass
Sucker
Sunfish
Surfperch
Surgeonfish
Tarpon
Tautog
Temperate bass
Tench
Tenpounder
Threadfin
Tigerfish
Tilapia
Tilefish
Tomcod
Topsmelt
Tripletail
Trout
Tuna
Turbot
Wahoo
Walleye
Walleye pollock
Warmouth
Weakfish
White fish
Whiting
Wrasse
Yellowtail
Yellowtail snapper

References

External links
Kashrut.com: Kosher and non-kosher fish (contains scientific names; includes higher taxonomic ranks)
Kosher-maor.com: The world's largest kosher fish list (uses scientific names; includes higher taxonomic ranks)

Halal food
Kashrut
Jewish cuisine
Edible fish